"Go into the Light" is the seventh solo single released by Ian McNabb. It was the third and final to be released from the album Head Like a Rock. The single charted at number 66 on the official UK charts.

Track listings

CD single
 "Go Into the Light" (Celestial Dub Mix) (7:22)
 "Rock" (3:00)
 "I Stood Before St. Peter" (3:45)
 "Go Into the Light" (3:52)

12" vinyl
 "Go Into the Light" (Celestial Dub Mix) (7:22)
 "For You, Angel" (7:46)
 "Go Into the Light" (3:51)

Numbered 12" vinyl
 "Go Into the Light" (Jah Wobble Mix)
 "Time You Were in Love"
 "Go Into the Light"

Cassette
 "Go Into the Light" (3:51)
 "Time You Were in Love" (4:25)

References

1994 singles
Ian McNabb songs
1994 songs